Antonio della Porta (c. 1631, Manno, Lugano - 3 August 1702, Bayreuth) was a Swiss Baroque architect and master builder, mainly active in Bohemia, Silesia and northern Bavaria.

External links
http://www.hls-dhs-dss.ch/textes/d/D24548.php

Architects from Ticino
17th-century architects
1702 deaths
Czech Baroque architects
German Baroque architects
Year of birth uncertain